Fipa (Fipa: Ichifipa) is a Bantu language of Tanzania. It is spoken by the Fipa people, who live on the Ufipa plateau in the Rukwa Region of South West Tanzania between Lake Tanganyika and Lake Rukwa. The ethnic group of the Fipa people is larger than the group of Fipa language speakers. On the Tanzanian side, people who speak Mambwe-Lungu may identify as Fipa and consider their language to be a dialect of Fipa. Lungu and Mambwe are also spoken in Zambia where they are considered languages and their speakers are considered to be ethnic groups in their own right, although linguists consider Lungu and Mambwe to be dialects of a single language. There are three dialects: Milanzi (also referred to as IchiSukuuma), Kwa (Ichikwa) and Nkansi.

Maho (2009) classifies M.131 Kulwe (Kuulwe, no ISO code) as closest to Fipa. Otherwise the dialects are Milanzi (Fipa-Sukuma, Icisukuuma), South Fipa, Kandaasi (Icikandaasi), Siiwa (Icisiiwa), Nkwaamba (Icinkwaamba), Kwa (Icikwa), Kwaafi (Icikwaafi), Ntile (Icintile, Cile), Peemba (Icipeemba).

Notes

References 
 Labroussi, Catherine. 1998. Le couloir de lacs: Contributions linguistique à l’histoire des populations du sud-ouest de la Tanzanie. Doctoral Dissertation, INALCO.
 Labroussi, Catherine. 1999. Vowel systems and spirantization in S.W. Tanzania. In Bantu historical linguistics, ed. Jean-Marie Hombert and Larry M. Hyman, 335–377. Stanford, CA: CSLI Publications.
 Struck, Bernhard. 1911. Die Fipasprache. Anthropos 6:951–994.
 Walsh, Martin T., and Imani N. Swilla. 2000. Linguistics in the corridor: A review of research on the Bantu languages of south-west Tanzania, north-east Zambia and north Malawi. Ms, Dar es Salaam.
 Whiteley, W. H. 1964. Suggestions for recording a Bantu language in the field. Tanganyika Notes and Records 62:1–19.
 Willis, Roy G. 1966. The Fipa and related peoples of south-west Tanzania and north-east Zambia. London: International African Institute.
 Willis, Roy G. 1968. The Fipa. In Tanzania before 1900, ed. Andrew Roberts, 82–95. Nairobi: East African Publishing House.
 Willis, Roy G. 1978. There was a certain man: Spoken art of the Fipa. Oxford: Oxford University Press.
 Woodward, Mark, Anna-Lena Lindfors, and Louise Nagler. 2008. A sociolinguistic survey of the Fipa language community: Ethnic diversity and dialect diversity. SIL Electronic Survey Report, SIL International.

External links 
 SIL sociolinguistic survey of the Fipa language community

Languages of Tanzania
Rukwa languages